Bad Buddy ("Just a Friend, Friend") is a 2021 Thai romantic BL comedy-drama television series starring Korapat Kirdpan (Nanon) and Pawat Chittsawangdee (Ohm). Based from the novel Behind The Scenes by Afterday and -West-, it tells the story of two boys who came from warring, neighboring families and found themselves competing for almost everything, but developed romantic feelings for each other along the way.

Directed by Noppharnach Chaiwimol (Aof) and produced by GMMTV, this series is one of 16 television series of GMMTV for 2021 during their "GMMTV 2021: The New Decade Begins" event on 3 December 2020.  It premiered on GMM25 on 29 October 2021, airing on every Friday at 20:30 ICT (8:30 pm), while its full uncut version aired at 22:30 ICT (10:30 pm) on WeTV. It replaced the Friday slot of the Fish upon the Sky rerun on GMM25.

It was featured on Teen Vogue's best BL dramas of 2022 list.

Synopsis 
The rivalry of Pat (Pawat Chittsawangdee), a cheeky and impulsive guy, and Pran (Korapat Kirdpan), a neat and tidy perfectionist has been passed down from a previous generation. They are destined to be enemies to each other even before they were born. Their family runs a hardware business side by side, and their parents hate one another to the core. For this reason, both of them have become rivals in any kind of competition.

When an incident happens at the age of 12, their hatred begins to dissolve: Pat's little sister, Pa (Pattranite Limpatiyakorn), starts drowning in a pond. While Pat is still in a state of shock and fear, Pran immediately rushes into the water and saves Pa from drowning. Their relationship has changed since then. On the surface, they still appear to be enemies, but they no longer truly detest each other. In the tenth grade, they are assigned to be in the same music band and become closer. Pran's family finds out, and he is sent away to a boarding school.

Two years later, they are brought together once again. Pat is chosen to be the freshman class president of the Faculty of Engineering while Pran is the class president of the Faculty of Architecture, two faculties that has a historic rivalry as well. Pa quickly finds out and asks Pat not to do Pran any harm because he was the one who saved her life. Pat and Pran's friends have a series of physical fights, and are told they will suffer consequences if they fight again. Pat and Pran, the leaders of their friend groups, decide to coordinate to keep their friends from running into each other. As they coordinate, they become closer, and eventually fall in love. They begin dating, hiding it from all of their friends and family until they are caught and must deal with the consequences.

Cast and characters

Main 
Korapat Kirdpan (Nanon) as Pran
Pawat Chittsawangdee (Ohm) as Pat

Supporting 
 Pattranite Limpatiyakorn (Love) as Pa
 Pansa Vosbein (Milk) as Ink
 Jitaraphol Potiwihok (Jimmy) as Wai
 Sattabut Laedeke (Drake) as Korn 
 Pahun Jiyacharoen (Marc) as Louis
 Theepakon Kwanboon (Prom) as Mo 
 Thakorn Promsatitkul (Lotte) as Safe
 Pakin Kuna-anuvit (Mark) as Chang 
 Puttipong Sriwat (Leo Putt) as Ming (Pat's father)
 Pattamawan Kaomulkadee (Yui) as Pat's mother
 Passin Ruangvuth (A) as Pran's father
 Paradee Vongsawad (Ple) as Dissaya (Pran's mother)
 Thanavate Siriwattanakul (Gap) as Chai
 Kongkiat Khomsiri (Kome) as Tong

Guest 
 Natachai Boonprasert (Dunk) Pat & Pran's school bandmate
 Passatorn Koolkang (Captain) Pat & Pran's school classmate
 Kittipop Sereevichayasawat (Satang) as Pat & Pran's school bandmate
 Napat Patcharachavalit (Aun) as Pat & Pran's school classmate
 Norawit Titicharoenrak (Gemini) as Pat & Pran's school junior
 Arun Asawasuebsakul (Ford) as Pat & Pran's school junior
 Nattawat Jirochtikul (Fourth) as Pat & Pran's school junior
 Achita Panyamang (Kim) as Young Pat
 Tanapatch Chanthasorn (Zen) as Young Pran
 Nichamon Ladapornpipat (Nene) as Young Pa
 Chertsak Pratumsrisakhon (Chert) as Professor Pichai
 Suphasawatt Purnaveja (Watt) as Professor of Architecture
 Yaowalak Mekkulwiroj as Professor/Lecturer
 Kusuma Teppharak (Pong) as Ms. Payao
 Chayanee Chaladthanyakij (Meen) as Ms. Sunee
 Thitisan Goodburn (Kim) as Ham
 Passakorn Chaithep (Cnine) as Junior
 Amata Piyavanich (Jum) as Junior's mother
 Pradit Prasartthong (Tou) as Yod
 Thanadon Meewongtham (Au)
 Kornprom Niyomsil (Au) as Toto
 Wisit Chantaraparb (Plug) as Chart
 Poom Kaewfacharoen as Architecture stageplay actor (as Kwan)

Reception

Thailand television ratings 
In the table below,  represents the lowest ratings and  represents the highest ratings.

 Based on the average audience share per episode.

Online ratings 
As of 15 November 2021, the series has become the No. 1 position on WeTV Thailand's most popular BL series rankings. It further become the most-streamed Thai television series and drama on 23 November 2021 and the most-watched title on the platform on 13 December 2021 after the release of Episode 7. Likewise, the series also made it to the Weekly Top 10 Most Watched Series of iWantTFC despite its exclusive availability in the Philippines. On the first rank release on 3 November 2021, the series' English-subtitled version reached Top 9. It consistently remained in the Top 10 throughout the weeks and as of 14 December 2021, few days after the release of Episode 7, the English-subtitled version reached Top 8 and the Filipino-dubbed version achieved Top 9.

Soundtracks

Awards and nominations

International broadcast 
 Philippines – The series is one of the newest five GMMTV television series alongside "Baker Boys", "Not Me", "Enchanté", and "F4 Thailand: Boys Over Flowers" (a Thai adaptation of Meteor Garden, which had a different versions in Taiwan, Japan, South Korea and China, which was aired before on ABS-CBN) was acquired by ABS-CBN Corporation, after its successful acquisition of eight previous series under GMMTV. It was announced by Dreamscape Entertainment on 28 June 2021. All episodes with English subtitles was made available for streaming via iWantTFC starting on 29 October 2021, simulcast with its Thailand broadcast. The platform likewise released the series as dubbed in Filipino starting with the first episode on 4 November 2021.
 Japan – The series is acquired by TV Asahi and au to be released in Japan for the first time on the streaming platform Telasa. The first episode premiered with Japanese subtitles on 11 November 2021 and the succeeding episodes has been available sequentially every Thursday.

Spin-off
Stories about Ink and Pa, a yuri couple in the series, have been made into an episode called "Zero Photography" of the miniseries Magic of Zero, released on 11 August 2022, with Pansa Vosbein and Pattranite Limpatiyakorn reprising their roles of Ink and Pa.

References

External links 
 Bad Buddy on GMM 25 website 
 Bad Buddy on WeTV
 Bad Buddy on GMMTV OFFICIAL YouTube Channel
 
 GMMTV

2020s LGBT-related comedy television series
2020s LGBT-related drama television series
2021 Thai television series debuts
2021 Thai television series endings
Television series by GMMTV
Thai boys' love television series
Thai romantic comedy television series